The Treaty of Dresden was concluded on 14 September 1699, preparing the Great Northern War. Augustus the Strong allied with Frederik IV of Denmark-Norway against Charles XII of Sweden.

Sources

Dresden
1699 treaties
1699 in Denmark
Treaties of Denmark–Norway
Treaties of the Electorate of Saxony
1699 in Europe
1699 in the Holy Roman Empire
17th century in Saxony
History of Dresden